Joseph John Reilly (1881–1951) was Professor of English at Hunter College.

References

Hunter College faculty
English literature academics
British literary critics

1881 births
1951 deaths